Yangcheon Heo clan was one of the Korean clans. Their Bon-gwan was in Gangseo District, Seoul. According to the 2015 Korean census, the number of Yangcheon Heo clan is 149,505. He was the descendant of Heo Hwang-ok, the queen consort of Suro, the first king of the Gaya confederacy. Heo Seon mun was appointed as Gongamchonju because Heo Seon mun made an achievement when Taejo of Goryeo in Goryeo conquered Gyeon Hwon and offered resources.

See also 
 Korean clan names of foreign origin

References

External links